The Expedition of al Raji, occurred directly after the Battle of Uhud in the year AH 4 of the Islamic calendar.

Background
Immediately after the Uhud battle, a group of men from Adal and al-Qarah came to Muhammad; requested him to send with them a few instructors to teach Islam to their people who had embraced Islam. Muhammad agreed to this, and promptly sent six men (or ten men as per Ibn Sa’d) with them. However, those emissaries were sent by the Banu Lahyan, who wanted to avenge the killing of their chief, Khalid bin Sufyan al-Hadhali in the Expedition of Abdullah Ibn Unais. Among the six missionaries selected by Muhammad was Asim bin Thabit, who was appointed the head of this delegation.

In a differing account in Sahih al-Bukhari, ten men were sent in all, and they were sent as spies, "to bring the enemy's secrets."

Attack on Muslims
When the Muslim party arrived at al-Raji, the delegation took rest for the night. Then a completely surprising attack with swords was initiated on the six Muslims to extract money from them. They promised not to kill them, but to derive money as ransom.

However, the Muslims refused to believe the promise of the polytheists and fought back. All the Muslims, except Zayd bin al-Dathinnah, Khubyab bin Adi and Abd Allah bin Tariq were killed. These three Muslims surrendered and were taken as prisoners to be sold in Mecca. Zayd bin al-Dathinah was sold to Safwan ibn Umayya, Abu Sufyan wanted to spare his life in exchange for the life of Muhammad. But Zayd's love for Muhammad was so great that he did not want Muhammad to be hurt even by a "thorn prick". The Quraysh killed all three Muslims.

According to the Muslim scholar Safiur Rahman Mubarakpuri, the Quraysh ordered Khubyab bin Adi to be crucified by Uqba bin al-Harith because he had killed Uqba bin al-Harith's father. He also mentions Zayd bin al-Dathinnah was purchased by Safwan ibn Umayya, and he killed Zayd bin al-Dathinnah because he killed his father on the battlefield.

After killing Asim ibn Thabit, Hudhayl wanted to sell his head.

It was then that Khubaib (one prisoner) first set the tradition of praying in prostration before being executed. According to Ar-Raheeq Al-Makhtum (The Sealed Nectar), he then said:

"O Lord! Count them one by one, exterminate them to the last one."

Motives for attacking Muslims
According to William Montgomery Watt, the most common version of the event states that the motives of the Banu Lahyan for attacking Muslims, was that the Banu Lahyan wanted to get revenge for the assassination of their chief at Muhammad's instigation. So they bribed the two tribes of Khuzaymah to say they wanted to convert to Islam. Watt also said that the seven men Muhammad sent may have been spies for Muhammad and instructors for Arab tribes. He also said that it is difficult to verify the exact date the assassination of their chief took place.

Watt's claim that they were spies and not missionaries is mentioned in the Sunni hadith collection Sahih al-Bukhari as follows:

Missionaries not spies
Although  mentions that the Muslims were actually spies and not missionaries, the Muslim scholar Safiur Rahman Mubarakpuri described the Muslims as people who will go to "instruct them in religion" and quoted part of  but failed to mention that they were spies. The 7th century Muslim scholar al-Waqidi also mentioned that they were spies but a tribe did come to them requesting to teach Islam but Muhammad decided to send them for spying to inform him about the Quraysh.

Islamic Sources

Biographical literature
This event is mentioned by Muslim historians Tabari, Ibn Hisham.  The Muslim jurist Ibn Qayyim Al-Jawziyya also mentions the event in his biography of Muhammad, Zad al-Ma'ad. and Ibn Sa’d also mentions the event in his book about Muhammad's battles. Modern secondary sources which mention this, include the award-winning book, Ar-Raheeq Al-Makhtum (The Sealed Nectar).

Hadith literature
The event is mentioned in the Sahih Muslim hadith collection as follows:

According to Ar-Raheeq Al-Makhtum (The Sealed Nectar), the event is also mentioned in the Sahih al-Bukhari hadith collection.
The killing of Khubyab bin Adi by Uqba bin al-Harith is mentioned in Sahih al-Bukhari as follows:

See also
Military career of Muhammad
List of expeditions of Muhammad
Muslim–Quraysh War

References

Notes

. Note: This is the free version available on Google Books

625
Campaigns ordered by Muhammad
Muhammad in Medina